, commonly known as simply  or in English as FC Cologne, is a German association football club based in Cologne.

This is the list of all 1. FC Köln's European matches.

Overall record
Accurate as of 3 November 2022.

By competition

Source: UEFA.com

By country

Results

European Cup

1 Liverpool advanced to the semi-finals by winning a coin toss after their play-off match ended 2–2.

UEFA Cup Winners' Cup

UEFA Cup / UEFA Europa League

UEFA Europa Conference League

UEFA Intertoto Cup

References

External links

 
German football clubs in international competitions